"Bananas (Who You Gonna Call?)" is the first single from Queen Latifah's fourth studio album, Order in the Court (1998). The song features the New Jersey rapper Apache, a member of Latifah's Flavor Unit. The song samples the Fugees "Fu-Gee-La". The song was recorded at Soundtrack Studios and Chung King Studios in New York City.

Music videos
There are two music videos for the song. In one version, the whole of "Bananas (Who You Gonna Call?)" is featured in the video. Latifah and actor Tommy Davidson are playing a video game called "Bananas". Latifah loses the game. This version of the music video has officially been posted on YouTube by Universal Music Group.

In the second version of the music video, only part of the song is featured in the video. After part of verse one, Latifah is shown losing the video game and she subsequently tells her male friend that she will get him in "Paper". Latifah's song "Paper" is then introduced to the video and plays until the video's closing. Latifah wins the video game in "Paper".

1998 singles
Queen Latifah songs
1998 songs
Songs written by Queen Latifah
Motown singles